Choice is an unincorporated community in Shelby County, Texas.

History
A post office called Choice was established in 1904, and remained in operation until 1954. According to tradition, the community's name stems from the literal reading of a postal form's instruction to "pick your choice".

References

Unincorporated communities in Shelby County, Texas
Unincorporated communities in Texas